Saint-Pierre or St Pierre or St. Pierre is the surname of:

 Charles-Irénée Castel de Saint-Pierre (1658–1743), proposed the creation of a European league of 18 sovereign states
 Georges St-Pierre (born 1981), Canadian MMA fighter
 Guy Saint-Pierre (born 1934), Canadian politician and businessman
 Jacques-Henri Bernardin de Saint-Pierre (1737–1814), French writer and botanist
 Liliane Saint-Pierre (born 1948), Belgian singer
 Marie-Josée Saint-Pierre (born 1978), Canadian filmmaker
 Allen St. Pierre, Executive Director of the National Organization for the Reform of Marijuana Laws
 Annie St-Pierre, Canadian film director and producer
 Brian St. Pierre (born 1979), former American football quarterback
 Christine St-Pierre (born 1953), journalist and Quebec politician
 Jonathan St-Pierre (born 1983), Canadian professional football player
 Kim St-Pierre (born 1978), Canadian ice hockey player
 Martin St. Pierre (racewalker) (born 1972), Canadian racewalker
 Martin St. Pierre (ice hockey) (born 1983), Canadian ice hockey player
 Monique St. Pierre (born 1953), German-American Playboy model and actress

French-language surnames